In supramolecular chemistry, molecular encapsulation is the confinement of a guest molecule inside the cavity of a supramolecular host molecule (molecular capsule, molecular container or cage compounds).  Examples of supramolecular host molecule include carcerands and endohedral fullerenes.

Reactivity of guests 
An important implication of encapsulation is that the guest behaves differently from the way it would when in solution. The guest molecule tends to be unreactive and often has distinctive spectroscopic signatures. Compounds normally highly unstable in solution, such as arynes or cycloheptatetraene, have been isolated at room temperature when molecularly encapsulated.

Examples
One of the first examples of encapsulating a structure at the molecular level was demonstrated by Donald Cram and coworkers; they were able to isolate highly unstable, antiaromatic cylobutadiene at room temperature by encapsulating it within a hemicarcerand. Isolation of cyclobutadiene allowed chemists to experimentally confirm one of the most fundamental predictions of the rules of aromaticity.

In another example the cage consists of a gallium tetrahedral cluster compound stabilized by 6 bidentate catechol amide ligands residing at the tetrahedron edges. The guest is a 16 electron and thus very reactive ruthenium metallocene (an organometallic catalyst) with a cyclopentadienyl ligand (red) and a 1,3,7-octatriene ligand (blue). The total charge for this anion is 11 and the counterions are  5 tetramethyl ammonium cations and 6 potassium cations. The ruthenium compound decomposes in water within minutes but encapsulated it survives in water for weeks.

Large metalla-assemblies, known as metallaprisms, contain a conformationally flexible cavity that allows them to host a variety of guest molecules.  These assemblies have shown promise as agents of drug delivery to cancer cells.

An application of encapsulation is controlling reactivity, spectroscopy, and structure. For instance, excited state reactivity of free 1-phenyl-3-tolyl-2-proponanone (abbreviated A-CO-B) yields products A-A, B-B, and AB, which result from decarbonylation followed by random recombination of radicals A• and B•. Whereas, the same substrate upon encapsulation reacts to yield the controlled recombination product A-B, and rearranged products (isomers of A-CO-B).

Other applications:
 the encapsulation of filaments of a self-assembling bi-copper complex in polymer nanowires.

Alcohol
According to food chemist Udo Pollmer of the European Institute of Food and Nutrition Sciences in Munich, alcohol can be molecularly encapsulated in cyclodextrines, a sugar derivate. In this way, encapsuled in small capsules, the fluid can be handled as a powder. The cyclodextrines can absorb an estimated 60 percent of their own weight in alcohol. A US patent has been registered for the process as early as 1974.

See also 
Cryptophane

References 

  Cram, D. J.; Tanner, M. E.; Thomas, R., The taming of Cyclobutadiene Angewandte Chemie International Edition Volume 30, Issue 8, Pages 1024 - 1027 1991 Abstract
  Stabilization of Reactive Organometallic Intermediates Inside a Self-Assembled Nanoscale Host Dorothea Fiedler, Robert G. Bergman, Kenneth N. Raymond Angewandte Chemie International Edition Volume 45, Issue 5, Pages 745 - 748 2006 Abstract
 

Supramolecular chemistry